The Danish pavilion houses Denmark's national representation during the Venice Biennale arts festivals.
The building was designed by Carl Brummer and constructed between 1930 and 1932, and restored and expanded by Peter Koch in the 1950s.

Background

Organization and building 

The pavilion, designed by Carl Brummer, was constructed between 1930 and 1932. Architect Peter Koch led a restoration and expansion between 1958 and 1960.

The Danish Arts Council Committee for International Visual Arts serves as commissioner for the Danish Pavilion at the Biennale, where Denmark has taken part since 1895.

Representation by year

Art 

 1999 — Jason Rhoades, Peter Bonde
 2003 — Olafur Eliasson
 2005 — Eva Koch, Joachim Koester, Peter Land, Ann Lislegaard, Gitte Villesen
 2007 — Troels Wörsel (Commissioner: Holger Reenberg; Assistant Commissioner: Stinna Toft Christensen)
 2009 — Elmgreen and Dragset
 2011 — Taryn Simon and others (Curator: Katerina Gregos)
 2013 — Jesper Just
 2015 — Danh Vo (Curators: Marianne Torp, Tine Vindfeld
 2017 — Kirstine Roepstorff
 2019 — Larissa Sansour
 2022 — Uffe Isolotto (Curator: Jacob Lillemose)

References

Bibliography

Further reading

External links 

 

Danish contemporary art
National pavilions